The 2013-14 season was Chesterfield's second in League Two following relegation in 2012, and manager Paul Cook's first full season in charge. After spending most of the season near the top of the table, Chesterfield were crowned League Two champions on the final day, to claim the League Two title for a record fourth time, and to seal their return to the third tier after a two-year absence.

Players

Current squad
As of 3 May 2014.

Out on loan

League table

Statistics
As of 3 May 2014.
Italics indicate loan player.
Asterisk (*) indicates player left club midseason.

Appearances

|}

Goalscorers

Results

Pre-season

League Two

F.A. Cup

League Cup

Football League Trophy

References

Chesterfield F.C. seasons
Chesterfield